Rules of Civility & Decent Behaviour In Company and Conversation is the name of a list best known as a school writing exercise of George Washington, who became the first president of the United States of America.  Most of the rules have been traced to a French etiquette manual written by Jesuits in 1595 entitled "Bienséance de la conversation entre les hommes". As a handwriting exercise in around 1744, Washington merely copied word-for-word Francis Hawkins' translation which was published in England in about 1640.

The list of rules opens with the following:

Every Action done in Company, ought to be with Some Sign of Respect, to those that are Present.
When in Company, put not your Hands to any Part of the Body, not  Discovered.
Shew Nothing to your Friend that may affright him.
In the Presence of Others Sing not to yourself with a humming Noise, nor Drum with your Fingers or Feet.
If You Cough, Sneeze, Sigh, or Yawn, do it not Loud but Privately; and Speak not in your Yawning, but put Your  or Hand before your face and turn aside.

The exercise goes on to list a total of 110 such rules.

The list features in the plot of the Amor Towles novel Rules of Civility, which is named after it.

Footnotes

External links 

 Transcript
 NPR article

George Washington
Etiquette